was a village located in Asa District, Yamaguchi Prefecture.

On October 1, 1954, the village merged into the city of Ube and dissolved. It is currently part of the northern region in the city of Ube.

Geography

History 
April 1889 - Due to the municipal status enforcement, the village was born as part of Asa District, Yamaguchi.
November 1, 1954 - The village along with the villages of Kotō and Nihose in Asa District, and the village of Higashikiwa in Yoshiki District merged into the city of Ube and dissolved.

See also 
 List of dissolved municipalities of Japan
 List of dissolved municipalities of Yamaguchi Prefecture
 小野村

External links
宇部市小野市民センターの紹介

Ono